Pityrogramma, the silverback ferns, or goldback ferns, is a fern genus in the subfamily Pteridoideae of the family Pteridaceae.

Species
, Plants of the World Online recognized the following species and hybrids:

Pityrogramma aurantiaca (Hieron.) C.Chr.
Pityrogramma austroamericana Domin
Pityrogramma calomelanos (L.) Link
Pityrogramma chrysoconia Maxon ex Domin
Pityrogramma chrysophylla Link
Pityrogramma dealbata (C.Presl) Domin
Pityrogramma dukei Lellinger
Pityrogramma ebenea (L.) Proctor
Pityrogramma eggersii Maxon
Pityrogramma elongata (C.Chr.) Pic.Serm.
Pityrogramma ferruginea (Kunze) Maxon
Pityrogramma × herzogii (Rosenst.) L.D.Gómez
Pityrogramma humbertii C.Chr.
Pityrogramma jamesonii (Baker) Domin
Pityrogramma lehmannii (Hieron.) R.M.Tryon
Pityrogramma × mckenneyi W.H.Wagner
Pityrogramma ochracea Domin
Pityrogramma opalescens Sundue
Pityrogramma pearcei Domin
Pityrogramma pulchella Domin
Pityrogramma rupicola Pic.Serm.
Pityrogramma schizophylla (Baker) Maxon
Pityrogramma sulphurea (Sw.) Maxon
Pityrogramma triangulata Maxon
Pityrogramma trifoliata (L.) R.M.Tryon
Pityrogramma williamsii Proctor

References

 eFloras entry

Pteridaceae
Fern genera